Itai Benjamini is an Israeli mathematician who holds the Renee and Jay Weiss Chair in the Department of Mathematics at the Weizmann Institute of Science.

Benjamini completed his Ph.D. in 1992 at the Hebrew University of Jerusalem, under the supervision of Benjamin Weiss. His dissertation was entitled "Random Walks on Graphs and Manifolds". In 2004 he won the Rollo Davidson Prize for young probability theorists "for his work across probability, including the analytic and geometric, particularly in the study of random processes associated with graphs".
In the same year he also won the Morris L. Levinson Prize of the Weizmann Institute.
He was an invited speaker at the International Congress of Mathematicians in 2010,
speaking about "random planar metrics".

Benjamini was a long time collaborator of Oded Schramm. Their joint works included papers on limits of planar graphs, noise sensitivity of Boolean functions and first passage percolation. With Olle Häggström, Benjamini edited the selected works of Oded Schramm.

Benjamini has also made contributions to the study of the Biham–Middleton–Levine traffic model  and
isoperimetric inequalities on Riemannian manifolds.

Selected publications

References

External links
Home page

Year of birth missing (living people)
Living people
Israeli mathematicians
Hebrew University of Jerusalem alumni
Academic staff of Weizmann Institute of Science
Probability theorists
Cellular automatists